Target range may refer to:
Shooting range
Optimal health range, in medicine diagnostics, concentration ranges for optimal health as alternative to reference range based on normal distribution.